John Muir's High Sierra is a 1974 American short documentary film directed by Dewitt Jones produced by Dewitt Jones and Lesley Foster. It was nominated for an Oscar for Best Documentary Short Subject.

See also
 List of American films of 1974

References

External links

John Muir's High Sierra at the National Archives and Records Administration

1974 films
1970s short documentary films
1974 short films
American short documentary films
1974 independent films
American independent films
Documentary films about nature
1970s English-language films
1970s American films